Tacky's War, Tacky's Revolt, or Tacky's Rebellion was a widespread slave rebellion in the British Colony of Jamaica in the 1760s.  Led by Akan people (then referred to as Coromantee but originally from around Kromantsie in the Central Region of Ghana) -- tribes including Ashanti, Fanti, Nzema and Akyem, -- it was loosely led by a Fanti royal and warlord called Tacky (Takyi) in eastern Jamaica, and Dahomean war chief or coastal headman Apongo in the western end of the island. 

Tacky's War was the most significant slave uprising in the Caribbean between the 1733 slave insurrection on St. John and the 1791 Haitian Revolution. According to Professor Trevor Burnard: "In terms of its shock to the imperial system, only the American Revolution surpassed Tacky's War in the eighteenth century." It was the most dangerous slave rebellion in the British Empire until the Baptist War of Samuel Sharpe in 1831–32, which also occurred in Jamaica.

Planning the revolution
The repression of the slaves in Jamaica was considered by contemporaries to be amongst the most brutal in the world. In 1739, Charles Leslie wrote that, "No Country excels (Jamaica) in a barbarous Treatment of Slaves, or in the cruel Methods they put them to Death."

The leader of the rebellion, Tacky (later spelt "Takyi"), was originally from the Fante ethnic group in West Africa and had been a paramount chief in Fante land (in the Central region of present-day Ghana) before being enslaved. He and his lieutenants planned to take over Jamaica from the British, and to create a separate black country. The uprising was inspired by the successful resistance of Free black people in Jamaica, such as the Asante Queen Nanny and the Jamaican Maroons during the First Maroon War of the 1730s.

Before being a slave, Tacky was king of his village. He himself recalled selling his rivals of the Ashanti, Nzema and Ahanta, off into slavery as spoils of war to the British. But ironically, he would become a slave himself when a rival state defeated his army in battle and sold him  into slavery, and he ended up in Jamaica. J.A. Jones, who claimed to have met him while being held captive by Tacky while trying to get an interview with him, wrote in his memoirs that Tacky spoke English fluently (as was common in the ruling class of Fantes at the time).

Also according to Jones, Tacky was discovered in a cave a year before the rebellion took place, planning with his comrades: Quaw (Fanti Ekow), Sang, Sobadou (twi Sobadu), Fula Jati and Quantee (twi Kwarteng). All except Fula Jati were of Akan descent.

The slave revolt was a coordinated island-wide conspiracy, led by a secret network of Akan (Coromantee) slaves.

Tacky's Rebellion 

Some time before daybreak on Easter Monday, 7 April 1760, Tacky, who was from the Fante ethnic group,and his followers began the revolt and easily took over the Frontier and Trinity plantations while killing some of their white overseers who worked there. However, Zachary Bayly, who owned Trinity, was not among those killed by the rebels.

Slaves also rebelled on the Esher estate owned by the wealthy William Beckford and they joined Tacky's forces.

Bolstered by their easy success, they made their way to the storeroom at Fort Haldane where the munitions to defend the town of Port Maria were kept. After killing the storekeeper, Tacky and his men commandeered nearly 4 barrels of gunpowder and 40 firearms with shot, before marching on to overrun the plantations at Heywood Hall and Esher.

By dawn, hundreds of other slaves had joined Tacky and his followers. At Ballard's Valley, the rebels stopped to rejoice in their success. One slave from Esher decided to slip away and sound the alarm. Obeahmen (Caribbean witch doctors) quickly circulated around the camp dispensing a powder that they claimed would protect the men from injury in battle and loudly proclaimed that an Obeahman could not be killed. Confidence was high.

On April 9th, Lieutenant Governor Sir Henry Moore, 1st Baronet dispatched a detachment of the 74th regiment, comprising between 70 and 80 mounted militia from Spanish Town to Saint Mary Parish, Jamaica.

These militia soldiers were joined by Maroons from Moore Town, Charles Town and  Scott's Hall, who were bound by treaty  and forced to suppress such rebellions. The Maroon contingents were commanded by Moore Town's white superintendent Charles Swigle, and the Maroon officers reporting to him were Clash and Sambo from Moore Town, Quaco and Cain from Charles Town, and Cudjo and Davy the Maroon from Scott's Hall.

Tacky's rebels burnt houses at Down's Cove in coastal St Mary. On April 12, the militia under Captain Rigby and Lieutenant Forsyth arrived at Down's Cove, where they were met by Charles Town Maroons (who were still called Crawford's Town Maroons by the colonial writers) led by Swigle, and a contingent of black soldiers. Tacky's men attacked Forsyth's contingent, and killed a number of white soldiers, losing only three freed slave rebels in the process. Tacky himself was reportedly wounded in the assault.

Defeat and death of Tacky
Captain William Hynes led his black regiment, and Swigle the Charles Town Maroons, in pursuit of Tacky through the forested mountains of the interior, and in "a rocky gully, between two steep Hills," defeated Tacky's men in a skirmish and captured a few of the rebel slaves. A day later, on April 13, the Maroons continued their pursuit of Tacky's men through the woods near Friendship estate.

When the militia learned of the Obeahman's boast of not being able to be killed, an Obeahman was captured, killed and hung with his mask, ornaments of teeth and bone and feather trimmings at a prominent place visible from the encampment of rebels. Many of the rebels, confidence shaken, returned to their plantations. Tacky reportedly reluctantly agreed to fight on, with about 25 other men.

On April 14, other Maroon parties from Scott's Hall and Moore Town joined the Charles Town Maroons, and led by Swigle, they engaged Tacky's men in a battle in Rocky Valley, and routed them, defeating and killing a number of the slave rebels. Tacky and the remainder of his men went running through the woods being chased by the Maroons and their legendary marksman, Davy. While running at full speed, Davy shot Tacky and cut off his head as evidence of his feat, for which he would be richly rewarded. Tacky's head was later displayed on a pole in Spanish Town until a follower took it down in the middle of the night. The rest of Tacky's men were found in a cave near Tacky Falls, having committed suicide rather than going back to slavery.

Aftermath of Tacky's Revolt
In May and June, a number of Tacky's men, who had surrendered, were executed after trials in Spanish Town and Kingston, Jamaica. One rebel named Anthony was hanged, while another named Quaco was burnt at the stake. Another two were hung up in chains, and starved to death.

In June 1760, similar plots had been discovered in Manchester Parish, and the now-defunct parishes of Saint John, Saint Dorothy and Saint Thomas-ye-Vale. In St Thomas-in-the-East (present day Saint Thomas Parish), a slave rebellion was betrayed by a conspirator named Cuffee, after which 19 rebels were executed. A similar planned revolt in Lluidas Calley in Saint John was also betrayed, this time by three rebel slaves. The conspiracy at Cocoa Walk Plantation at Saint Dorothy was revealed, and in July four of the rebels were executed, while another six were re-sold into slavery in a neighbouring Spanish colony. 

In July, another revolt in Saint Thomas-in-the-East was crushed by a Maroon party led by Swigle, killing one leader named Pompey, while another named Akim hanged himself.

Akua, "Queen of Kingston" 
It was also discovered that Coromantee slaves in Kingston had elected a female Fante slave named Cubah (a British misnomer of the Fante day name “Akuba” or "Akua") the rank of 'Queen of Kingston'. Cubah (Akua) sat in state under a canopy at their meetings, wearing a robe and a crown.

It is unknown whether there was any direct communication between Cubah's people and Tacky's, but when discovered, she was ordered to be transported from the island for conspiracy to rebel. 

Whilst at sea, she bribed the captain of the ship to put her ashore in western Jamaica where she joined the leeward rebels and remained at large for months. On being recaptured, she was executed.

Apongo and the Western Revolt of 1760-1 

The revolt did not end there, as other rebellions broke out all over Jamaica, many of which were rightly or wrongly attributed to Tacky's cunning and strategy. Other slaves learned of Tacky's revolt, which inspired unrest and disorder throughout the island. Rebels numbering about 1,200 regrouped in the unsettled mountainous forests in western Jamaica, under the leadership of a rebel slave christened Wager, but going by his African name of Apongo. They attacked eight slave plantations in Westmoreland Parish and two in Hanover Parish, killing a number of whites.

Apongo had been a military leader in West Africa before he was captured and brought to Jamaica as a slave. His enslaver in Jamaica, planter and naval officer Arthur Forrest, was given command of HMS Wager during this time, and subsequently renamed Apongo as Wager; Apongo was then sent by his enslaver to work as a slave on a plantation Forrest owned in Westmoreland Parish. Apongo organised a rebellion, which began on 7 April 1760, and went on until October of the following year. Vincent Brown argues that Apongo's rebellion in western Jamaica was more significant than Tacky's uprising in St Mary.

According to Thomas Thistlewood, a planter in western Jamaica who kept a diary, Apongo was a "prince in Guinea", who paid homage to the King of Dahomey. Thistlewood claimed that Apongo was "surprised and took prisoner when hunting, and sold for a slave." Vincent Brown argues that Apongo may have been a war chief of Dahomey, or a coastal headman with a troubled relationship with British traders.

The start of the western revolt 

Slaves shaved their heads to signal the start of the uprising. 

On May 25, the western rebellion started when rebels under the command of Apongo rose up in revolt on the Masemure estate in Westmoreland. One of Apongo's lieutenants, Simon, fired the shot that killed Masemure's managing attorney, John Smith, and that signalled the start of the western rebellion. The rebels had timed their rebellion to coincide with the departure of a naval escort from the bay of Bluefields, Jamaica, correctly assuming that security would be more lax at that time.

Apongo later admitted that he had planned to attack the bay, but some of his lieutenants argued against an attack on the coast. Vincent Brown surmised that Simon may have been one of those lieutenants who preferred to fight on in the forested mountains.

The rebels were well-stocked in their attempts to resist militia counter-attacks. After the assault on the Rebel's Barricade, militia soldiers found over 70 hogsheads of gunpowder, and mahogany chests full of clothes, ruffled shirts, laced hats, shoes, stockings and cravats, among the basic necessities. 
 
Refugees, both white and black, fled to the Westmoreland capital of Savanna-la-Mar and surrounding ports. Militias counter-attacked with sporadic engagements, and in the process captured and killed a number of rebels. Many of those captured were promptly executed without trial.

On May 29, an attempt by the Westmoreland militia to storm the rebels' barricaded encampment was soundly defeated and repelled. This success resulted in the rebels gaining more recruits by the day, and so demoralised the militia that they started to suffer from significant numbers of desertions.

The British military takes command  

Lieutenant Governor Moore once again declared martial law.

A company of the 74th regiment, which was quartered at Savanna-la-Mar, and two detachments from the Maroon towns, then joined the militia. On June 1–2, bolstered by militias from two more western parishes, a detachment of British soldiers and sailors, and the skilled Maroon warriors of Accompong Town, the colonial forces successfully stormed the barricade and drove the slave rebels out following a two-hour battle, killing and capturing scores of rebels. A party of Accompong Maroons led by Maroon Captain Quashee, reporting to white superintendent John Kelly, captured six rebel slaves in one skirmish.

During the battle, an untold number of rebel men, women and children were driven over a steep precipice, and fell to their deaths in the canyon below. In addition, many Africans were shot and killed, or taken captive. The rebel deaths may have numbered in the hundreds. Many were hastily executed after being captured, and militia writers believe no more than 400 rebels survived the battle. 

However, despite this overwhelming victory, the colonial armies had difficulty making headway against the guerrilla warfare now being employed by smaller groups of Apongo's rebels. On June 5, the British military commander, Robert Spragge, found that the only group that was able to follow up with successes against the rebels was the Maroons of Cudjoe's Town (Trelawny Town). Under Maroon captains Furry of Trelawny Town and Accompong's Quashee, they killed more than a dozen rebels, and captured another 60, whom they brought to the estate of Moreland on June 6. 

The rebel slaves continued fighting for the rest of the year in western Jamaica, forcing the governor, Sir Henry Moore, 1st Baronet, to continue imposing martial law in Westmoreland and surrounding areas. 

On June 7, there were uprisings in Saint James Parish, Jamaica and Hanover, but the attempts by the rebels to take the plantation of Glasgow were repelled by the planters, their white employees, armed sailors, and loyal slaves. Furry and his Trelawny Maroons then ambushed the rebels as they went east, killing several. However, most of the rebel slaves escaped.

On June 10, on the outskirts of the estate of Mesopotamia, owned by Joseph Foster Barham I, a detachment of soldiers and militia defeated a band of rebel slaves, killing about 40 and capturing another 50.

On June 20, the militia killed and captured 100 rebel slaves in Westmoreland. On June 22, one of the rebel slaves was given a speedy trial for the murder of two white children, and once convicted, was burnt alive.

That same day, another uprising in St James was thwarted, and more than 60 Africans were captured. Most of the captured Africans were speedily executed. However, many more slaves escaped into the Cockpit Country, where they united with Apongo's rebels. Several of these groups of smaller rebel bands moved between the mountains and the forests to escape hunting bands of militia and the Maroons.

Defeat and death of Apongo 

Facing defeat, many rebels committed suicide. Militia writers boasted that about 700 rebels were killed in the western conflict. Thistlewood noted the stench of death emanating from nearby woods, where colonists also reported encountering hanging bodies of African men, women and children.

Rebels were surrendering every day. On July 3, the "King of the Rebels" Apongo was among those rebel slaves captured by the militia. Another rebel named Davie was executed by being put in the gibbets to starve to death, which took a week to reach its conclusion. Apongo himself was hung up in chains for three days, after which he was to be taken down and burnt to death, according to his sentence.

However, Apongo died in his cage within the three days, escaping the final part of his sentence.

The rebellion under leadership of Simon 

The remaining rebels then fell under the leadership of an escaped slave named Simon, which took refuge in the Cockpit Country at a place called High Windward, from which they mounted a number of attacks on nearby plantations in Saint Elizabeth Parish. In October, in one such raid, the rebels attacked and destroyed Ipswich sugar estate, which was located at the mouth of the Y.S. river. On December 23, Simon's rebels burnt down a house belonging to a Thomas Durrant, and shot another white man.

High Windward eventually became the headquarters of another community of runaway slaves at the end of the century, led by Cuffee (Jamaica). It was reported that Simon's rebels numbered about 50 armed men and women, and that their goal was to secure recognition for their freedom, similar to the status accorded to the Maroons of Trelawny Town.

Shortly afterwards, parties sent to hunt Simon's rebels reported killing some of the Africans, whereupon they cut off their heads, and stuck them on poles. However, Simon and the majority of his rebels escaped, and the Assembly then summoned Hynes and his black regiment to hunt Simon and his rebels. 

In January 1761, Simon's rebels relocated to a place named Mile Gully, which was then situated in Clarendon Parish, Jamaica. There were reports that Simon was shot and killed in a skirmish with a party sent to apprehend the rebel slaves.

Despite Simon's death, his band of rebels continued to raid western estates, possibly under a new leader. By late 1761, Governor Moore declared that the main western revolt was over. However, some remaining rebels scattered in small bands continued operating from the forested interior of the Cockpit Country, and they conducted a campaign of guerrilla warfare for the rest of the decade, staging raids on plantations within their reach.

In 1763, bands of rebels thought to have been members of Simon's gang attacked plantations in Westmoreland and Hanover, killing several white people. This attack was brought to the attention of the new governor, William Henry Lyttelton, who aborted a tour to deal with the crisis, with the help of the Maroons of Trelawny Town.

Other uprisings in the 1760s

The rebellions of Tacky and Apongo continued to inspire uprisings during the decade of the 1760s. In 1764, the authorities in Spanish Town uncovered a conspiracy of enslaved people.

In 1765, an uprising in St Mary resulted in enslaved people setting the Whitehall estate of Zachary Bayly on fire. The revolt was led by Abruco, who was given the slave name of Blackwall, and had been acquitted for his role in Tacky's Revolt of 1760 for lack of evidence. Several white plantation workers were killed, but when Bayly led his militia against the rebels, and killed several of them, after which other rebels committed suicide. This time around, Abruco was condemned to be burnt alive, while other rebels were hanged or transported and sold.

In October 1766, another rebellion took place in Westmoreland, also inspired by Tacky's Revolt. About 33 Akan slaves rose up in revolt, and killed 19 whites, before it was brutally suppressed. Several weeks afterwards, the militia were still hunting rebels. Rebels who were convicted were sentenced to be burnt alive.

Most of the remaining rebels then moved to the south-western Saint Elizabeth Parish, where they operated out of the mountainous forests of Nassau Mountain.

Aftermath 

It took months and even years for order to be restored, depending on which parish the rebels operated from. Over 60 white people had lost their lives, and a similar number of free people of colour, in addition to 400 or so black slaves, including two ringleaders who were burned alive, and two others who were hung in iron cages at the Kingston Parade until they starved to death. More than 500 rebel slaves were "transported", or re-sold as slaves to new owners in the British colony in the Bay of Honduras. It is estimated that the destruction caused by Tacky's Revolt, and other spin-off rebellions, cost the Colony of Jamaica over £100,000, which is many millions in today's currency.

The colonial Assembly passed a number of draconian laws to regulate the slaves in the aftermath of Tacky's Revolt. In addition, they banned the West African religious practices of obeah.

Tacky Monument in Claude Stuart Park can be visited in Port Maria, the parish capital of St Mary. Tacky Falls is accessible by the sea but the overland route is considered by locals to be too tough to travel. The waterfalls have diminished over the years and mainly eroded rocks mark the course. The exact location of the cave where the remains of Tacky's men were found is not known.

Tacky's Rebellion was, like many other Atlantic slave revolts, put down quickly and mercilessly by colonial officials. Planters severely punished rebel slaves. However, the spin-off rebellions lasted for several months and even years after the main revolt was crushed. In addition, there is no record of Simon's runaway communities being routed. It is possible that they may have merged with other successful runaway communities in subsequent decades, and they may have served as an inspiration for other slave revolts. 

Contemporary historian Robert Charles Dallas wrote that in the 1770s, a community of runaway slaves formed the Congo Settlement in the Cockpit Country, and resisted efforts by the Accompong Maroons to break them up until the end of the century. It is possible that the rebel slaves of Simon, and those from the 1766 Revolt, made up a significant part of these Free black people in Jamaica. Many of the survivors of this community went on to fight on the side of Cudjoe's Town (Trelawny Town) in the Second Maroon War.

References

Further reading
 
 
 
 

1760 in Jamaica
1761 in Jamaica
Conflicts in 1760
Conflicts in 1761
18th-century rebellions
Wars involving Jamaica
Resistance to the British Empire
18th-century history of the British Army
Slavery in Jamaica
Afro-Caribbean history
Slave rebellions in North America
History of the Colony of Jamaica